Drepanoides is a genus of snake in the family Colubridae  that contains the sole species Drepanoides anomalus. It is commonly known as the black-collared snake.

It is found in South America.

References 

Dipsadinae
Monotypic snake genera
Snakes of South America
Reptiles of Bolivia
Reptiles of Brazil
Reptiles of Colombia
Reptiles of Ecuador
Reptiles of French Guiana
Reptiles of Peru
Fauna of the Amazon
Reptiles described in 1863
Taxa named by Giorgio Jan